Gianni Tozzi (born 6 May 1962) is an Italian former athlete who competed in the sprint hurdles. He won the silver medal at the 1987 Mediterranean Games. In addition, he represented his country at the 1987 World Championships without advancing from the first round.

Biography
His personal bests are 13.61 seconds in the 110 metres hurdles (+0.5 m/s; Barcelona 1988) and 7.82 seconds in the 60 metres hurdles (Turin 1989).

International competitions

References

External links
 

1962 births
Living people
Italian male hurdlers
World Athletics Championships athletes for Italy
Sportspeople from the Province of Chieti
Mediterranean Games silver medalists for Italy
Mediterranean Games medalists in athletics
Athletes (track and field) at the 1983 Mediterranean Games
Athletes (track and field) at the 1987 Mediterranean Games